Henry Parker may refer to:

 Henry Parker (MP for Bedford) (by 1509–1551), MP for Bedford
 Sir Henry Parker (MP for Hertfordshire) (died 1552), MP for Hertfordshire
 Sir Henry Parker, 2nd Baronet (1638–1713), English politician
 Henry Meredith Parker (1796–1868), British writer
 Henry Parker (bishop) (1852–1888), Anglican bishop in Africa
 Henry Parker (writer) (1604–1652), political writer during the English Civil War
 Henry Parker (Georgia official) (c. 1690–c. 1777), colonial governor of the U.S. state of Georgia
 Sir Henry Parker (Australian politician) (1808–1881), Premier of New South Wales
 Henry Parker (cricketer) (1819–1901), English clergyman and cricketer
 Henry Taylor Parker (1867–1934), American theater and music critic
 Henry Wise Parker, British admiral, second husband of Dame Dehra Parker
 Henry Parker (author), British engineer in 19th century colonial Sri Lanka, author of Ancient Ceylon and Village folk-tales of Ceylon
 Henry H. Parker (1858–1930), English landscape artist
 Henry Hodges Parker (1834–1927), kahu (pastor) of Kawaiahaʻo Church in Honolulu
 Henry Perlee Parker (1795–1873), English history painter
 Henry Parker, 10th Baron Morley (c. 1480–c. 1553/6), English peer and translator
 Henry Parker, 11th Baron Morley (1533–1577), English peer
 Henry Parker, 14th Baron Morley (c. 1600–1655)
 Henry Parker (Royal Navy officer) (born 1963), British admiral
 Henry Villiers Parker, Viscount Boringdon (1806–1817), British nobleman

See also
 Baron Morley
 Harry Parker (disambiguation)